is a Japanese sprinter who specialised in the 400 metres. He represented his country at the 2007 World Championships and 2011 World Championships.

His personal best in the event is 45.87 seconds set in Fukuroi in 2013.

Competition record

References

1987 births
Living people
Sportspeople from Ibaraki Prefecture
Japanese male sprinters
World Athletics Championships athletes for Japan
Asian Games medalists in athletics (track and field)
Athletes (track and field) at the 2010 Asian Games
Universiade medalists in athletics (track and field)
Asian Games silver medalists for Japan
Medalists at the 2010 Asian Games
Universiade bronze medalists for Japan
Medalists at the 2009 Summer Universiade
21st-century Japanese people